Frederick or Fred Dean may refer to:

Sports
 Frederick Dean (rugby union) (1880–1946), Cornish rugby union player
 Fred Dean (1952–2020), American football defensive end
 Fred Dean (offensive lineman) (born 1955), American football guard
 Fred Dean (Australian footballer) (1909–1989), Australian rules footballer

Other
 Frederick Dean (SA Navy) (1900–1983), South African military commander
 Frederick James Dean (1868–1941), British trade unionist